Sir James Somerville, 1st Baronet (c. 1698 – 16 August 1748) was an Irish politician.

He was the only son of Thomas Somerville and his wife Sarah King, daughter of James King. In 1729, Somerville entered the Irish House of Commons as Member of Parliament for Dublin City, representing the constituency until his death in 1748. In 1736, he was appointed Lord Mayor of Dublin. On 14 February 1748, only months before his death, he was created a Baronet of Somerville, in the County of Meath.

On 2 February 1713, he married Elizabeth Quayle, daughter of James Quayle.

Somerville was succeeded in the baronetcy by his eldest son Quaile. His second son, Major William Somerville, was buried at St. Audoen's Church, Dublin.

References

1690s births
1748 deaths
Year of birth uncertain
Baronets in the Baronetage of Ireland
Irish MPs 1727–1760
Lord Mayors of Dublin
Members of the Parliament of Ireland (pre-1801) for County Dublin constituencies